"No Sell Out" is a hip hop piece composed by American drummer Keith LeBlanc under the moniker Malcolm X, released in November 1983 on Tommy Boy Records. It marked the one of the earliest usages of sample-based composition in popular music as well as being the first hip hop song to use Malcolm X's voice for artistic and political reasons.

Background
The idea for the piece was originally conceived when LeBlanc heard Grandmaster Flash playing a record in conjunction with the sample "Do you feel lucky, punk?" taken from the 1971 action film Dirty Harry. In an interview with The Quietus, Leblanc recalled: "I just thought the combination of a beat and music and spoken word over the top of it was pretty magical to me." Leblanc began listening to Malcolm X's spoken word recordings while experimenting with different drum beats.

The recording marked LeBlanc's first time working extensively with drum machines and as a producer, with the project being financed by Marshall Chess. LeBlanc opted to use the newest gear affordable, using an Oberheim DMX and E-mu Drumulator to create and program the music. The spoken word passages were used with the permission of Betty Shabazz, with a percentage of the proceeds going to the family of Malcolm X. Previous to contacting Tommy Boy Records, LeBlanc wanted Sugar Hill Records to issue the recording, but was discouraged by their unwillingness to provide royalties to Malcolm's family.

Composition
The composition makes use of several samplings of Malcolm X's voice which are placed over a syncopated beat-box driven electro beat. The audio clips are primarily taken from the speech he gave after the firebombing of his house. The song is punctuated by the spoken chorus "Malcolm X - no sell out", which is repeated several times in the duration of the track.

Release and reception

Some were initially perturbed by the idea of a white musician using the words of an African-American activist in a popular music song. LeBlanc, who hadn't considered the response his music would generate, said, "I got press calling me from all over the world, all pissed off, I thought 'OK, maybe this was a little bit cutting edge!" However, some realized the musical and political importance of LeBlanc's composition and the song received acclaim in underground circles. Betty Shabazz, an American civil rights advocate and Malcolm X's widow, was aware of her husband's rising influence on members of the hip hop community and sanctioned the use of Malcolm's speech. Her preface to the piece, which appears the vinyl's jacket:

After the single's release, Sugar Hill Records took Tommy Boy Records to court for infringement, claiming the record company profited from voice samples that belonged to them. It was re-issued a year later as a tribute to the UK miners' strike of 1984 and 1985.

The single was a hit in the club scene and received airplay in the UK. People magazine described the piece as "nothing if not provocative" that "succeed[s] in reminding the listener of the challenging directness of Malcolm's rhetoric." British music magazines Sounds, Melody Maker and the New Musical Express made "No Sell Out" their "Single of the Week" and ran terse summaries of Malcolm X's political career alongside their review. Jon Savage of New Society commented that "rarely has a record so united the pop press", further commenting that "this extraordinary record has redefined dance forms in the way that Grandmaster Flash's Wheels of Steel did two years ago, taking the cut-ups of current New York styles to one logical conclusion".

Accolades 

(*) designates unordered lists.

Influence 
The song "No Sell Out" represented a shift toward more politically conscious topics in the hip hop community. It was released on the heels of the single "How We Gonna Make the Black Nation Rise?" by Brother D (Daryl Aamaa Nubyahn), a song that took a nationalist stance. "No Sell Out" was the beginning of a movement in which hip hop artists motivated by political ideology, including Public Enemy, would utilize samples of Malcolm X's voice in their compositions. However, in contrast to other artists who used his voice, the single is unique in that Malcolm X receives compositional credit in the LP's liner notes and that his family received royalties generated by the single's success. It was also the first instance of a hip hop artist using a deceased individual's voice for artistic purposes.

The track was sampled by Tragedy Khadafi on his song "Black & Proud" from the 1990 album Intelligent Hoodlum, which also sampled Malcolm X.

Formats and track listing 
All songs written by Keith LeBlanc and Malcolm X
US 12" single (TB 840)
"No Sell Out" – 5:44
"No Sell Out" (instrumental version) – 7:09

Personnel 
Adapted from the No Sell Out liner notes.

Music personnel
Reggie Griffin – bass guitar, rhythm guitar, Minimoog, Voyetra-8
Keith LeBlanc – Oberheim DMX, E-mu Drumulator, Minimoog, Voyetra-8, producer
Malcolm X – spoken word

Technical personnel
Robert Haggins – photography
Chris Lord-Alge – mixing
Herb Powers Jr. – mastering
Eric Thorngren – engineering

Charts

Release history

References

External links 
 

1983 songs
1983 singles
Works about Malcolm X
Song recordings produced by Keith LeBlanc
Songs written by Keith LeBlanc
Tommy Boy Records singles